Sue Hammell (born June 18, 1945) is a Canadian politician who is the former MLA for Surrey-Green Timbers in the province of British Columbia for most of the years between 1991 and 2017, she retired and did not seek re-election in May 2017.

Her most recent appointment is Official Opposition Critic for Mental Health and Substance Use. Previously her other Opposition roles were:  Official Opposition Deputy House Leader and the Opposition Critic for Women’s Issues, Child Care and Early Learning. Her previous government cabinet minister appointments were:
 Minister of Housing, Recreation and Consumer Services
 Minister Responsible for Co-Operatives 
 Minister of Women’s Equality

She moved with her husband to Surrey-Green Timbers area in 1990. Before entering provincial politics, she was the executive assistant to the mayor of the City of Surrey, British Columbia.

As a member of the British Columbia New Democratic Party, she was elected to the Legislative Assembly in the 1991 election and re-elected in 1996, but was defeated in the 2001 election. When out of the legislature, she worked as executive director for Surrey Aboriginal Society in 2002. She then returned to the Assembly by winning the riding in the 2005 election, and was re-elected in 2009.

On May 12, 2009, Sue Hammell won with the largest margin of support in BC out of 85 ridings with 72.7%.

In 1999, she was the founder of Minerva Foundation for B.C. Women.

Family
She and her husband John Pollard (d. 2019) had one adult daughter, named Sage.

Election results 

|-

|-

|NDP
|Sue Hammell
|align="right"|5,592
|align="right"|36.31%
|align="right"|-13.80%
|align="right"|$37,237

|}

|-

|NDP
|Sue Hammell
|align="right"|10,278
|align="right"|50.11%
|align="right"|+3.95%
|align="right"|$36,931

|-

|Progressive Conservative
|Cliff Blair
|align="right"|179
|align="right"|0.87%
|align="right"|n/a
|align="right"|

|Independent
|Don Knight
|align="right"|101
|align="right"|0.49%
|align="right"|n/a
|align="right"|$1,245

|Natural Law
|Ross Ranger
|align="right"|32
|align="right"|0.16%
|align="right"|n/a
|align="right"|$110

|}

|-

|NDP
|Sue Hammell
|align="right"|8,708
|align="right"|46.16%
|align="right"|n/a
|align="right"|$32,800
|-

|}

Cabinet positions

References

External links
40th Parliament MLA Biography, Retrieved January 5, 2017

1945 births
Living people
British Columbia New Democratic Party MLAs
Women government ministers of Canada
Members of the Executive Council of British Columbia
People from Surrey, British Columbia
Women MLAs in British Columbia
20th-century Canadian politicians
20th-century Canadian women politicians
21st-century Canadian politicians
21st-century Canadian women politicians